Vaulx Carter (August 14, 1863 – before 1930) was an American college football player and engineer who is best remembered as the first coach of the Navy Midshipmen football program. He was born in Tennessee and raised there for part of his childhood, until he was orphaned and adopted by family members in Pennsylvania. Starting in 1880, Carter attended the United States Naval Academy; he struggled academically at the school, only excelling in his art classes. Carter failed his final examinations in his final two years at the academy and was recommended for removal following the second failure. This did not happen, as he was forced to voluntarily resign from the school in 1883 due to permanent injuries received from an accident.

Carter's time at the Naval Academy was not without success; in his second year, he singlehandedly managed to restart the school's football program after a two-year hiatus. Carter guided his team as a player-coach for the season, leading them to a victory over students from Johns Hopkins University, the first win in school history.

Information about Carter following his resignation from the academy is scarce. One Navy football historian described him as having "disappeared from the historical record". He attended some classes at Swarthmore College in 1883, but he did not complete a course. During the late 1880s, Carter was an instructor at the Hebrew Technical Institute and also worked as an engineer; he designed a parachute and a model of a plan for the Nicaragua Canal, both of which attracted media attention. During the 1890s, he was an assignee for several corporations in New York City. Carter served as a lieutenant in the New York State Militia from 1902 to 1910. Later, during the 1920s, he lived with his sister on a farm in New York, occasionally writing articles for a magazine she edited. According to census records, Carter died sometime before 1930.

Biography and career

Early life and Naval Academy
Vaulx Carter was born on August 14, 1863, in Davidson County, Tennessee, the sixteenth of seventeen children to Samuel Jefferson Carter, a Southern Unionist and prominent Nashville hotelier. His mother was Anne Vaulx, the elder Carter's second wife. Among Vaulx's siblings were William Harding Carter, a major general in the United States Army and Medal of Honor recipient, and Laura Carter Holloway, a writer, newspaper editor, and Theosophist figure. He was raised there for the early part of his life, but was orphaned along with two of his siblings following his father's death in March 1873 and his mother's the next year. The siblings remained without a guardian until February 1875, when they were adopted by a family member and spent the rest of their childhood in Pennsylvania. In September 1880, Carter passed the entrance examinations for the United States Naval Academy and on the twenty-second of that month, he was admitted into the school, one of four people selected to represent Pennsylvania at the academy in that year's class. In his second year at the school, Carter excelled in English and drawing, but had poor discipline and received 109 demerits; using a point evaluation system, the Naval Academy gave Carter fifty-three out of a possible seventy-six points for his conduct during the year. Between his second and third years, Cater sailed on the U.S.S. Constitution as a part of the Academy's summer cruise. His conduct worsened that year, and he only excelled in drawing. At the end of the year, Carter received ninety-nine of a possible one-hundred fifty-two points. Carter was scheduled to graduate from the Naval Academy in 1884, but was forced to resign in 1883. While performing his duties as a naval cadet, Carter became caught in a gale and fell. He received permanent injuries from the accident, which caused his resignation on June 14, 1883.

1882 football season
[[File:1882 Naval Academy vs. Clifton AC Football Headline.png|thumb|right|The headline from The Sun'''s article about the game against the Clifton Athletic Club|alt=A scan of a newspaper article headline reading: "A Rousing Foot-Ball Game: The Clifton Club Gave the Naval Academy Team a Hard Struggle"]]
In 1879, football began as a sport at the Academy. Student William John Maxwell organized a team made up of fellow students, without any support of faculty. He organized a game with the Baltimore Athletic Club, which ended in a scoreless tie.Patterson (2000), p. 21 Maxwell graduated in 1880, and the football program ended in his absence. In 1882, Carter re-initiated and organized a new football team. He took a position as the team coach, the first in school history; he also functioned as a back when playing. He scheduled a single game for the season, which was played on Thanksgiving Day against the Baltimore-based Clifton Football Club. The Clifton team was made up of players from Johns Hopkins University, who were unable to play for their school due to the administrator's negative views towards the sport.Kroll (2002), p. 14 Carter designed a maroon and white uniform for the squad and a strip of leather which was nailed to the bottom of their shoes to prevent slipping.

It snowed heavily before the game, to the point where players for both teams had to clear layers of snow off of the field, making large piles of snow along the sides of the playing ground. The first half of the game was scoreless; the Baltimore American reported that "the visitors pushed Navy every place but over the goal line in the first half". During play, the ball was kicked over the seawall a number of times, once going so far out it had to be retrieved by boat before play could continue. The American'' described the second half in detail:
 After ten minutes interval the ball was again put in play, this time being kicked off by the Cliftons. The rest period had apparently stiffened the Cliftons, for the Academy making a vigorous spurt got the ball thru them, and Street, following it up well, scored a touchdown for the Academy.

 The try at goal failed, but the ball, instead of going to the Cliftons behind the line, fell into the field and into the hands of one of the Academy team. By a quick decisive run, he again got the ball over the Cliftons goal line and scored a touchdown.

The Naval Academy won the contest 8–0, which made it the Academy's first ever football victory, and was the first match in which they recorded points. It would remain the school's only victory until the 1884 season, and would remain as the last shutout for the school until 1886, when a squad defeated Johns Hopkins 6–0. Carter's single win gives him the second fewest in Navy football history, behind interim coach Rick Lantz. However, his undefeated record and perfect win percentage remain the highest ever for the academy.

After the Naval Academy
Little is known of Carter after he left the Naval Academy. Sportswriter Jack Clary, in his history of the Navy Midshipmen football program, describes Carter as having "disappeared from the historical record", his establishment of the football team being Carter's "only claim to fame". Sometime between 1890 and 1893, Carter was hired as the treasurer and assignee for the Cowles Engineering Company. The organization was created in 1890 under official laws of the state of New Jersey, under the leadership of William Cowles. It served branches of the U.S. Government and the city of New York. The company went into bankruptcy and failed three years later, owing its creditors over $30,000 (equivalent to $ respectively in ). The year of Carter's death is unknown.

Head coaching record
team

References

Notes

Footnotes

Bibliography
Books and reports

 
 
 
 
 
 
 
 

Newspaper and journal articles

 
  
 
 
 

Websites

External links
 
 

1863 births
Year of death missing
19th-century players of American football
Navy Midshipmen football coaches
Navy Midshipmen football players
Player-coaches
Players of American football from Tennessee